These are the Billboard R&B singles chart number-one singles of 2001.

Chart history

See also
2001 in music
List of number-one R&B hits (United States)

References

2001
United States RandB
2001 in American music